was a converted Mitsubishi G3M2 Model 21 bomber operated by the Mainichi Shimbun newspaper and used to make a round-the-world flight in 1939.

The round the World flight
Nippon took off from Haneda airport in the district of Kamata in Tokyo on 25 August 1939,  flew around the globe and returned to Tokyo, after 55 days, on 20 October 1939 having flown  in 194 flying hours.

The aircraft
Nippon had the armament removed, was equipped with the latest autopilot and could carry 5,200 L of fuel enabling it to fly continuously for 24 hours.

Flight course 
Tokyo - Chitose - Nome, Alaska - Fairbanks, USA - Whitehorse - Seattle - Oakland, USA - Los Angeles - Albuquerque, USA - Chicago - New York - Washington D.C - Miami - San Salvador, El Salvador - Cali, Colombia -  Lima - Arica - Santiago - Buenos Aires - Santos (Brazil) - Dakar - Casablanca Morocco - Seville, Spain - Rhodos, Greece - Basra (Iraq) - Karachi - Kolkata, India - Bangkok - Taipei - Haneda, Tokyo

Specifications (Mitsubishi G3M2 Model 21)

Occupants 
There were seven occupants in total.
Captain  Sumitoshi NAKAO 中尾純利
Flight engineer  Hajime SHIMOKAWA 下川一
Communication operator  Nobusada SATO 佐藤信貞
Pilot  Shigeo YOSHIDA 吉田重雄
Professional Engineer  Hiroshi SAEKI 佐伯弘
Flight engineer  Nagasaku YAOKAWA 八尾川長作
Ambassador of goodwill Takeo OHARA 大原武夫, Aerial director of Mainichi Shimbun.

Notes

References 

  (new edition 1987 by Putnam Aeronautical Books, .)
 
 翼をください, 2009, 
 毎日新聞ウェブページ・ニッポン号：世界一周の快挙から70年
 JCAL NIPPON Round the World Flight Japanese

External links 
 A blog with images

History of aviation
Aircraft manufactured in Japan
Mitsubishi aircraft
Individual aircraft